Johann Suibert Seibertz (27 November 1788, Brilon - 17 November 1871, Arnsberg) was a German lawyer, judge and historian. His eldest son Engelbert Seibertz became a painter.

19th-century German historians
People from Brilon
1788 births
1871 deaths
19th-century German judges
19th-century German lawyers
19th-century German writers
19th-century German male writers